The 1916 Hornsey by-election was held on 6 December 1916.  The by-election was held due to the incumbent Conservative MP, Lawrence Dundas, becoming Governor of Bengal.  It was won by the Conservative candidate Kennedy Jones.

References

Hornsey by-election
Hornsey by-election
20th century in Middlesex
Hornsey,1916
Political history of Middlesex
Hornsey,1916
Hornsey
Unopposed by-elections to the Parliament of the United Kingdom (need citation)
Hornsey by-election